Bejuco is a corregimiento in Chame District, Panamá Oeste Province, Panama with a population of 5,548 as of 2010. Its population as of 1990 was 3,643; its population as of 2000 was 4,509.

References

Corregimientos of Panamá Oeste Province